The Kia EV6 is a battery electric compact crossover SUV produced by Kia. Introduced in March 2021, it is the first Kia dedicated electric vehicle, and the first model developed on the Electric Global Modular Platform (E-GMP) similar to the Hyundai Ioniq 5. It is also the first model to be named under the new nomenclature designated for a line of Kia electric cars, which will range from EV1 to EV9. The EV6 is the 2022 European Car of the Year.

Overview 
The EV6 was released on 2 August 2021 after a set of pictures were revealed on 15 March 2021. Developed under the codename CV, it is the first Kia model based on the E-GMP electric car platform.

The GT model is claimed to have a  time in 3.5 seconds, rapid 800V charging capability and vehicle-to-load function.

It features a panoramic curved display panel inside, which opens up more space while a controller for transition between infotainment and HVAC below the navigation screen and touch buttons for using heated seat as well as steering wheel further enhance driver usability. The crossover is claimed to be furnished with sustainable materials for its door pocket, crash pad, mood lighting, garnish and Nappa leather seats. It also has augmented reality head-up display, 360° camera option, remote controlled parking, along with safety technologies including Lane Follow Assist, Highway Driving Assist 2 (semi-autonomous adaptive cruise control) including auto lane changing, AEB collision avoidance, remote smart parking assist and Safe Exit Assist.

EV6 GT 
The EV6 GT was released on October 4, 2022; it is a high-performance version of the EV6, supposed to go from zero to 100 km in 3.5 seconds. The EV6 GT features four-piston calipers with a monoblock front wheel that improves size/performance over the base model, and a body strengthened with front strut ring and rear luggage floor reinforcement bars. In addition, rack-driven power steering and variable gear ratio technology optimize steering response to speed.

As for the design, GT-specific 21-inch wheels and neon-colored calipers stand out, and a diffuser is applied at the bottom of the rear bumper to optimize the air flow under the car to help accelerate. The interior is equipped with a D-cut steering wheel, GT Mode buttons, seats, and other neon colors. In addition, GT Mode with RBM function that maximizes the use of regenerative braking and Kia's first Drift Mode are applied.

Specifications

Reviews and reception 
In December 2022, Bloomberg named the EV6 as a superior alternative to the Model 3 from Tesla for those turned off by Elon Musk.

Awards 
 'Best of the Best' in 2022 Red Dot Design Awards
 2022 European Car of the Year
 2022 Irish Car of the Year
 2022 What Car? Car of the Year
 'Premium' winner in the German Car of the Year 2022 awards
 'Crossover of the Year' at the TopGear.com 2021 awards
 Joint winner of the inaugural 'Best Cars of the Year' 2021/2022 awards
 Product Carbon Footprint certificate from United Kingdom's The Carbon Trust.
 2023 ICOTY Green car awards
 2023 North American Utility Vehicle of the Year
 2023 MotorWeek Driver's Choice best of the year

Safety  
The EV6 received a five-star Euro NCAP safety rating.

References

External links 

 Official website

EV6
Cars introduced in 2021
Compact sport utility vehicles
Crossover sport utility vehicles
Production electric cars
All-wheel-drive vehicles
Euro NCAP large family cars